Peter E. Small (birth registered first ¼ 1939) is an English former rugby union and professional rugby league footballer who played in the 1950s, 1960s and 1970s.

Background
Peter Small's birth was registered in Pontefract district, West Riding of Yorkshire, England, and he was a pupil at Airedale High School.

Playing career

International honours
Peter Small won a cap playing , i.e. number 5, and scored a try for Great Britain while at Castleford in the 8–27 defeat by New Zealand at Carlaw Park, Auckland on Saturday 11 August 1962.

County honours
Peter Small won a cap for Yorkshire while at Castleford playing left-, i.e. number 11, in the 15–14 victory over Australia at Belle Vue, Wakefield on Wednesday 4 October 1967.

County League appearances
Peter Small played in Castleford's victory in the Yorkshire County League during the 1964–65 season.

County Cup Final appearances
Peter Small played left-, i.e. number 11, in Castleford's 11–22 defeat by Leeds in the 1968 Yorkshire County Cup Final during the 1968–69 season at Belle Vue, Wakefield on Saturday 19 October 1968.

BBC2 Floodlit Trophy Final appearances
Peter Small played  in Castleford's 4–0 victory over St. Helens in the 1965 BBC2 Floodlit Trophy Final during the 1965–66 season at Knowsley Road, St. Helens on Tuesday 14 December 1965, and played right-, i.e. number 12, in the 7–2 victory over Swinton in the 1966 BBC2 Floodlit Trophy Final during the 1966–67 season at Wheldon Road, Castleford on Tuesday 20 December 1966.

Honoured at Castleford
Peter Small is a Castleford Tigers Hall of Fame Inductee.

References

External links
!Great Britain Statistics at englandrl.co.uk (statistics currently missing due to not having appeared for both Great Britain, and England)
Image "Bringing Small round - Ron Barritt bringing Peter Small round after he had been felled by a Keighley player. - 20/08/1972" at rlhp.co.uk
Image "Syd Hynes Looks For A Pass - Leeds' Syd Hynes looks to send Alan Smith away as Peter Small covers for Bradford. - 22/10/1972" at rlhp.co.uk
Image "A Perfect Hand Off - A perfect hand off by Peter Small during todays match at Odsal against Wigan - 25/02/1973" at rlhp.co.uk
Image "The team ready to leave - The players give the thumbs up as they prepare to board the coach for Wembley. - 11/05/1973" at rlhp.co.uk

1939 births
Living people
Bradford Bulls players
Castleford R.U.F.C. players
Castleford Tigers players
English rugby league players
English rugby union players
Great Britain national rugby league team players
Hull Kingston Rovers players
Rugby league players from Pontefract
Rugby league second-rows
Rugby league wingers
Rugby union players from Pontefract
Yorkshire rugby league team players